The dinar (ISO 4217 currency code: TND) is the currency of Tunisia. It is subdivided into 1000 milim or millimes. The abbreviation DT is often used in Tunisia, although writing "dinar" after the amount is also acceptable (TND is less colloquial, and tends to be used more in financial circles); the abbreviation TD is also mentioned in a few places, but is less frequently used, given the common use of the French language in Tunisia, and the French derivation of DT (i.e.).

Etymology
The name "dinar" is derived from the Roman denarius, used in the Africa province, the antique territory of Carthage, modern day Tunisia.

History
The dinar was introduced in 1960, having been established as a unit of account in 1958. It replaced the franc at a rate of 1000 francs = 1 dinar. The dinar did not follow the devaluation of the French franc in 1958, thus the exchange rate peg was abandoned. Instead a peg to the United States dollar of 1 dinar = 2.38 dollars was established which was maintained until 1964, when the dinar devalued to 1 dinar = 1.90 dollars. This second rate was held until the dollar was devalued in 1971.

Tunisia had a historically low inflation. The dinar was less volatile in 2000–2010 than the currencies of its oil-importing neighbors, Egypt and Morocco. Inflation was 4.9% in fiscal year 2007–08 and 3.5% in fiscal year 2008–09. However, the value of the currency has been falling since then, and between 2008 and 2018, the dinar depreciated by about 55% against the U.S. dollar, from 76¢ to 34¢, and about 46% against the euro, from 55 cents to 30 cents.

Coins
In 1960, aluminium 1, 2 and 5 millime and brass 10, 20, 50 and 100 millime coins were introduced. The 1 and 2 millimes were last issued in 1990 and 1983 respectively, and are no longer legal tender. In 1968, nickel  dinar coins were introduced, replaced by smaller, cupro-nickel pieces in 1976, when cupro-nickel 1 dinar coins were also introduced. Bimetallic 5 dinar coins were introduced in 2002.

Coins in circulation are (link included current and historic coins and banknotes)
1 millime
5 millimes
10 millimes
20 millimes
50 millimes
100 millimes
200 millimes
 dinar
1 dinar
2 dinars
5 dinars

It was on 26 December 2013 that the two new tridecagonal coins were introduced, 200 millimes (copper-zinc, 29 mm diameter, 1.80 mm thickness, 9.4 gr. weight) and 2 dinar (copper-nickel, 29.4 mm diameter, 1.90 mm thickness, 11.2 gr. weight).

Banknotes
The designs of these denominations were changed with a series of notes dated 1-6-1965, but issued on 3 March 1966. A 10-dinar note dated 1-6-1969 was issued on 2 January 1970. The last -dinar notes were dated 1973-10-15 whilst the last 1-dinar notes were dated 1980-10-15. 20-dinar notes dated 1980-10-15 were introduced on 26 December 1984. 30-dinar notes were issued between 1997 and 2011. 50-dinar notes dated 2008 were issued on 25 July 2009. On 8 November 2005, an updated version of the frequently used 10-dinar note was issued.

On 31 December 2019, all notes issued prior to 2011 were completely demonetized. Previous issues had ceased to be used for several years beforehand but were still exchangeable at the Central Bank until that date.

After the fall of the Ben Ali regime in Tunisia, a new set of banknotes was issued progressively, with a redesigned 20-dinar note issued in 2017 and a redesigned 10-dinar note issued in 2020. As of 2020, the 20 and 50 dinar notes issued 2011 and the 5 and 10 dinar notes issued 2013 are in use as well as the new series. 50 dinar notes are withdrawn when sent to the Central Bank in the course of their circulation, but a new design for this denomination has not yet been confirmed.

In 2022, new banknotes of 5 and 50 dinars were introduced.

Popular nomenclature
Tunisians sometimes do not use the main division, dinar, when mentioning prices of goods. This convention is used even for higher prices, for example 70,000 dinars would be called  (seventy million). "Francs" is also still heard from time to time, 1000 of them colloquially representing a single dinar.
In addition to that, Tunisians tend to use the word "frank" instead of millime. For example, 100 millimes (0.1 Dinars) is referred to as "miyat frank" (Literally 100 franks). The word Frank is originated from French colony era.

Currency restrictions

It is a criminal offence in Tunisia to import or export dinar. Every year, each citizen can convert into foreign currency up to 6,000 Tunisian dinars before departure from the country. Therefore, prices at duty-free shops are in convertible currencies such as euros, US dollars and British pounds.  There are many converting ATMs in the country for tourists.

See also

 Economy of Tunisia
 Carthaginian shekel
 Denarius
 Tunisian rial or piastre
 Tunisian franc

References

External links
 Historical banknotes of Tunisia 

Economy of Tunisia
Currencies introduced in 1960